"You Enjoy Myself", commonly abbreviated to "YEM", is a Phish song written by Trey Anastasio, first played live on February 3, 1986. It is the band's most frequently performed song, having been played at about 33% of their first 1,800 shows.

History
Trey Anastasio wrote "You Enjoy Myself" while in Florence, Italy. The title came from an Italian man, befriended by Anastasio and Jon Fishman, who wrapped his arms around them near the Uffizi museum and exclaimed, "you know, when I am with you, you enjoy myself!"

A short, a cappella version of "You Enjoy Myself" appeared on The White Tape, Phish's debut album. A longer, full-band version appeared on their album  Junta. Live versions (especially after 1995) have regularly exceeded 25 minutes in length.

Fans have dubbed sections of the song with names like "Pre-Nirvana," "Nirvana," "The Note," "The Second Note" and "The Charge." When the song is performed live, one section features Anastasio and bassist Mike Gordon jumping on trampolines in tandem.

Legacy
The song was ranked #85 in the list of the 100 Greatest Guitar Songs of All Time of Rolling Stone. "You Enjoy Myself" is keyboardist Page McConnell's favorite Phish song.

Appears on
Phish (The White Tape) (1986)
Junta (1989)
Stash (1996)
A Live One (1995)
Live Phish Volume 7 (2002)
Live Phish Volume 9 (2002)
Live Phish Volume 11 (2002)
Live Phish Volume 14 (2002)
Live Phish Volume 15 (2002)
Live Phish 04.05.98 (2005)
New Year's Eve 1995 (2005)
Colorado '88 (2006)
Live Phish 11.14.95 (2007)
Vegas 96 (2007)
At the Roxy (2008)
Chicago '94 (2012)

See also
List of Phish songs
Phish discography

References

External links
Phish.Net FAQ: You Enjoy Myself

Phish songs
1986 songs
Jazz fusion songs
Songs written by Trey Anastasio